Şavşat District is a district of Artvin Province of Turkey. Its seat is the town Şavşat. Its area is 1,316 km2, and its population is 16,975 (2021).

Composition
There is one municipality in Şavşat District:
 Şavşat

There are 65 villages in Şavşat District:

 Akdamla
 Arpalı
 Aşağıkoyunlu
 Atalar
 Balıklı
 Çağlıpınar
 Çağlıyan
 Çamlıca
 Çavdarlı
 Çayağzı
 Çermik
 Cevizli
 Çiftlik
 Ciritdüzü
 Çoraklı
 Çukur
 Dalkırmaz
 Demirci
 Demirkapı
 Dereiçi
 Dutlu
 Düzenli
 Elmalı
 Erikli
 Eskikale
 Hanlı
 Ilıca
 Karaağaç
 Karaköy
 Kayabaşı
 Kayadibi
 Kirazlı
 Kireçli
 Kocabey
 Köprülü
 Köprüyaka
 Küplüce
 Kurudere
 Maden
 Meşeli
 Meydancık
 Mısırlı
 Oba
 Otluca
 Pınarlı
 Şalcı
 Savaş
 Saylıca
 Sebzeli
 Şenköy
 Şenocak
 Susuz
 Taşköprü
 Tepebaşı
 Tepeköy
 Üzümlü
 Veliköy
 Yağlı
 Yamaçlı
 Yaşar
 Yavuzköy
 Yeşilce
 Yoncalı
 Yukarıkoyunlu
 Ziyaret

References

Districts of Artvin Province